Pragathi Gramin Bank was a Regional Rural Bank established under Regional Rural Banks' Act 1976, was a Scheduled Bank jointly owned by Government of India, Canara Bank and Government of Karnataka (share capital contributed in the ratio of 50:35:15 respectively), permitted to carry all kinds of banking business. The Bank was operating in 9 districts of Karnataka, having its Head Office at Ballari.

Pragathi Krishna Gramin Bank with Head Office at Bellary was started on 23 August 2013 with the amalgamation of 2 RRBs viz, Canara Bank Sponsored Pragathi Gramin Bank (Headquartered at Bellary) and erstwhile State Bank of India Sponsored Krishna Grameena Bank (Headquartered at Kalaburagi). The Bank was formed as per gazette Notification of Government of India No. F1/5/2011- RRB (Karnataka) dated 23 August 2013.

History 

Year - event
 1976 - Tungabhadra Gramin Bank established on 25 Jan
 2005 - Pragathi Gramin Bank formed on 12 Sep
 2013 - The Bank was amalgamated with Krishna Grameena Bank to form Pragathi Krishna Gramin Bank, on 23 August (Headquartered at Ballari).

See also 
 Indian banking
 List of banks in India
 Kaveri Grameena Bank
 Karnataka Gramin Bank

References

External links 

 Official Website
 Internet Banking

Regional rural banks of India
Banks based in Karnataka
Companies based in Ballari
Banks established in 2005
Indian companies established in 2005
2005 establishments in Karnataka
Banks disestablished in 2013
Indian companies disestablished in 2013
2013 disestablishments in Karnataka